Retrocausality, or backwards causation, is a concept of cause and effect in which an effect precedes its cause in time and so a later event affects an earlier one. In quantum physics, the distinction between cause and effect is not made at the most fundamental level and so time-symmetric systems can be viewed as causal or retrocausal. Philosophical considerations of time travel often address the same issues as retrocausality, as do treatments of the subject in fiction, but the two phenomena are distinct.

Philosophy

Philosophical efforts to understand causality extend back at least to Aristotle's discussions of the four causes. It was long considered that an effect preceding its cause is an inherent self-contradiction because, as 18th century philosopher David Hume discussed, when examining two related events, the cause, by definition, is the one that precedes the effect.

In the 1950s, Michael Dummett wrote in opposition to such definitions, stating that there was no philosophical objection to effects preceding their causes. This argument was rebutted by fellow philosopher Antony Flew and, later, by Max Black. Black's "bilking argument" held that retrocausality is impossible because the observer of an effect could act to prevent its future cause from ever occurring. A more complex discussion of how free will relates to the issues Black raised is summarized by Newcomb's paradox. Essentialist philosophers have proposed other theories, such as the existence of "genuine causal powers in nature" or by raising concerns about the role of induction in theories of causality.

Physics
The ability to affect the past is sometimes taken to suggest that causes could be negated by their own effects, creating a logical contradiction such as the grandfather paradox. This contradiction is not necessarily inherent to retrocausality or time travel; by limiting the initial conditions of time travel with consistency constraints, such paradoxes and others are avoided.

Aspects of modern physics, such as the hypothetical tachyon particle and certain time-independent aspects of quantum mechanics, may allow particles or information to travel backward in time. Logical objections to macroscopic time travel may not necessarily prevent retrocausality at other scales of interaction. Even if such effects are possible, however, they may not be capable of producing effects different from those that would have resulted from normal causal relationships.

Relativity
Closed timelike curves, in which the world line of an object returns to its origin, arise from some exact solutions to the Einstein field equation. Although closed timelike curves do not appear to exist under normal conditions, extreme environments of spacetime, such as a traversable wormhole or the region near certain cosmic strings, may allow their formation, implying a theoretical possibility of retrocausality. The exotic matter or topological defects required for the creation of those environments have not been observed.  Furthermore, the chronology protection conjecture of Stephen Hawking suggests that any such closed timelike curve would be destroyed before it could be used. These objections to the existence of closed timelike curves are not universally accepted.

Quantum physics

Retrocausality is associated with the Double Inferential state-Vector Formalism (DIVF), later known as the two-state vector formalism (TSVF) in quantum mechanics, where the present is characterised by quantum states of the past and the future taken in combination.

Wheeler–Feynman absorber theory, proposed by John Archibald Wheeler and Richard Feynman, uses retrocausality and a temporal form of destructive interference to explain the absence of a type of converging concentric wave suggested by certain solutions to Maxwell's equations. These advanced waves have nothing to do with cause and effect: they are simply a different mathematical way to describe normal waves. The reason they were proposed is that a charged particle would not have to act on itself, which, in normal classical electromagnetism, leads to an infinite self-force.

Ernst Stueckelberg, and later Richard Feynman, proposed an interpretation of the positron as an electron moving backward in time, reinterpreting the negative-energy solutions of the Dirac equation. Electrons moving backward in time would have a positive electric charge. Wheeler invoked this concept to explain the identical properties shared by all electrons, suggesting that "they are all the same electron" with a complex, self-intersecting world line. Yoichiro Nambu later applied it to all production and annihilation of particle-antiparticle pairs, stating that "the eventual creation and annihilation of pairs that may occur now and then is no creation or annihilation, but only a change of direction of moving particles, from past to future, or from future to past." The backwards-in-time point of view is nowadays accepted as completely equivalent to other pictures, but it has nothing to do with the macroscopic terms "cause" and "effect", which do not appear in a microscopic physical description.

Retrocausality is sometimes associated with the nonlocal correlations that generically arise from quantum entanglement, including for example the delayed choice quantum eraser. However accounts of quantum entanglement can be given which do not involve retrocausality. They treat the experiments demonstrating these correlations as being described from different reference frames that disagree on which measurement is a "cause" versus an "effect", as necessary to be consistent with special relativity. That is to say, the choice of which event is the cause and which the effect is not absolute but is relative to the observer. The description of such nonlocal quantum entanglements can be described in a way that is free of retrocausality if the states of the system are considered. Physicist John G. Cramer has explored various proposed methods for nonlocal or retrocausal quantum communication and found them all flawed and, consistent with the no communication theorem, unable to transmit nonlocal signals.

Quantum gravity
Quantum gravity requires a reconciliation of both relativity and quantum physics. It has been suggested that "A classical notion of a causal structure is ... untenable in any framework compatible with the basic principles of quantum mechanics and classical general relativity," along with a Bell-type theorem providing a basis by which this could in principle be experimentally tested.

Tachyons
Hypothetical superluminal particles called tachyons have a spacelike trajectory, and thus can appear to move backward in time, according to an observer in a conventional reference frame. Despite frequent depiction in science fiction as a method to send messages back in time, tachyons do not interact with normal tardyonic matter in a way that would violate standard causality. Specifically, the Feinberg reinterpretation principle means that ordinary matter cannot be used to make a tachyon detector capable of receiving information.

Parapsychology
Retrocausality is claimed to occur in some psychic phenomena such as precognition. J. W. Dunne's 1927 book An Experiment with Time studied precognitive dreams and has become a definitive classic. Parapsychologist J. B. Rhine and colleagues made intensive investigations during the mid-twentieth century. His successor Helmut Schmidt presented quantum mechanical justifications for retrocausality, eventually claiming that experiments had demonstrated the ability to manipulate radioactive decay through retrocausal psychokinesis. Such results and their underlying theories have been rejected by the mainstream scientific community and are widely accepted as pseudoscience, although they continue to have some support from fringe science sources.

Efforts to associate retrocausality with prayer healing have been similarly rejected.

From 1994, psychologist Daryl J. Bem has argued for precognition. He subsequently showed experimental subjects two sets of curtains and instructed them to guess which one had a picture behind it, but did not display the picture behind the curtain until after the subject made their guess. Some results showed a higher margin of success (p. 17) for a subset of erotic images, with subjects who identified as "stimulus-seeking" in the pre-screening questionnaire scoring even higher. However, like his predecessors, his methodology has been strongly criticised and his results discounted.

See also
 Advanced potential
 Reversal of temporal order judgment
 Transactional interpretation
 Time's Arrow and Archimedes' Point - a 1996 book by philosopher Huw Price which argues that retrocausality can resolve philosophical issues in quantum mechanics

References

Causality
Metaphysics of science
Quantum mechanics
Thought experiments
Parapsychology